Bulambuli is a town in Eastern Uganda. It is the main municipal, administrative and commercial center of Bulambuli District. The district is named after the town.

Location
The approximate coordinates of Bulambuli are:1°09'36.0"N, 34°23'48.0"E (Latitude:1.160000; Longitude:34.396667). The coordinates are approximate because Bulambuli does not yet show up on most publicly available maps as of May 2014.

Population
, the exact population of the town of Bulambuli is not known. The next national population census is planned for August 2014.

Points of interest
The following points of interest lie within the town limits or close to the edges of the town:
 The headquarters of Bulambuli District Administration
 The offices of Bulambuli Town Council
 Bulambuli Central Market
 Mount Elgon - The town lies in the foothills of the Mountain.

See also

References

External links
 No Bins, Latrines In Bulambuli Town Council

Bulambuli District
Populated places in Eastern Region, Uganda
Cities in the Great Rift Valley
Bugisu sub-region